Ante Tomić (born 23 May 1983) is a Croatian former professional footballer who played as a midfielder. He is currently working as an assistant manager of the Croatia national under-21 team.

He joined Dinamo Zagreb in 1993 and had spent most of his career in the club, with the exception of one-season loans at Croatia Sesvete, Inter Zaprešić and Skoda Xanthi. He made a total of 74 league appearances for the club and scored five goals. With Dinamo, he won four Prva HNL titles, three Croatian Cups and one Croatian Super Cup.

He also made appearances for the youth selections of the Croatia national football team. Tomić was capped 29 times, most of which he made as an Croatia under-21 member.

Club career
Ante Tomić joined Dinamo Zagreb in 1993 and had been a member of the club until the summer of 2010. He made his debut in Dinamo Zagreb's first team in September 2001, aged 18. He made a total of 7 league appearances for the 2001–02 season and scored a goal. His most successful season with Dinamo Zagreb was 2006–07 Prva HNL when he made 16 league appearances in their title winning campaign. He had brief loan spells with Croatian clubs Croatia Sesvete and Inter Zaprešić. He also went on loan to Greek club Skoda Xanthi where he made 22 league appearances. He spent 2011 at Japanese club Sanfrecce Hiroshima, though he was released from his contract at the end of the season.

International career
Tomić made his first official cap for the Croatia under-16 in a friendly match against the Czech Republic. He made a total of eight appearances for the under-16 team. He also participated in three qualifying matches for the under-17 team. Tomić made most of his appearances for the under-21 team where he was capped nine times.

Club statistics

Honours

Dinamo Zagreb
Prva HNL: 4
 2006, 2007, 2008, 2009
Croatian Cup: 3
 2004, 2007, 2009
Croatian Supercup: 1
 2006

Koper
Slovenian Football Cup: 1
 2015

Slovenian Supercup: 1
 2015

References

External links
 

1983 births
Living people
Footballers from Zagreb
Association football midfielders
Croatian footballers
Croatia youth international footballers
Croatia under-21 international footballers
GNK Dinamo Zagreb players
NK Croatia Sesvete players
NK Inter Zaprešić players
Xanthi F.C. players
FC Koper players
Sanfrecce Hiroshima players
Ehime FC players
Croatian Football League players
Slovenian PrvaLiga players
Super League Greece players
J1 League players
J2 League players
Croatian expatriate footballers
Expatriate footballers in Greece
Croatian expatriate sportspeople in Greece
Expatriate footballers in Slovenia
Croatian expatriate sportspeople in Slovenia
Expatriate footballers in Japan
Croatian expatriate sportspeople in Japan
HNK Rijeka non-playing staff